Troublesome Creek is a stream in Knox, Lewis and Marion counties in the northeastern part of the U.S. state of Missouri. It is a tributary of the South Fabius River.

It crosses under Missouri Route 6 east of Edina and on to the south of Knox City and enters Lewis County south of La Belle. It crosses Missouri Route 156 northeast of Steffenville and enters Marion County northeast of the community of Nelsonville.

Troublesome Creek was so named on account of its frequent flash floods.

See also
List of rivers of Missouri

References

Rivers of Knox County, Missouri
Rivers of Lewis County, Missouri
Rivers of Marion County, Missouri
Rivers of Missouri